Håkon Helgøy (born 10 October 1947) is a Norwegian politician for the Christian Democratic Party.

He served as a deputy representative to the Norwegian Parliament from Rogaland during the terms 1985–1989 and 1989–1993.

On the local level he was a member of Hjelmeland municipality council.

References

1947 births
Living people
Deputy members of the Storting
Christian Democratic Party (Norway) politicians
Rogaland politicians
Place of birth missing (living people)
20th-century Norwegian politicians